Tang-e Pari Olya (also Romanized as Tang-e Parī ʿOlyā; also known as Tang-e Parī) is a village in Itivand-e Jonubi Rural District, Kakavand District, Delfan County, Lorestan Province, Iran. At the 2006 census, its population was 156, in 29 families.

References 

Towns and villages in Delfan County